The 2021 Supersport 300 World Championship was the fifth season of the Supersport 300 World Championship of motorcycle racing.

The season was marred by the death of Dean Berta Viñales, who was killed in an accident at the first race of the Jerez round.

Race calendar and results

Entry list

All entries used Pirelli tyres.

Championship standings
Points

Riders' championship

Manufacturers' championship

Notes

References

External links
 

Superbike
Supersport 300 World Championship seasons
Motorcycle racing controversies